This is a list of Albanian sculptors.

Sculptors
 Kolë Idromeno (1860–1939)
 Murad Toptani (1867–1918)
 Odhise Paskali (1903–1985)
 Dhimitër Çani (1904–1990)
 Janaq Paço (1914–1991)
 Sadik Kaceli (1914–2000)
 Kristina Koljaka (1916–2005)
 Nexhmedin Zajmi (1916–1991)
 Kristaq Rama (1932–1998)
 Vasiliev Nini (1954)
 Genc Mulliqi (1966)
 Ardian Pepa (1977)
 Agim Rada (1953)
 Saimir Strati (1966)
 Helidon Xhixha (1970)

Albanian sculptors
Sculptors